Perfecting Women: Maulana Ashraf Ali Thanawi's Bihishti Zewar is a partial translation with commentary of Bihishti Zewar by Barbara Daly Metcalf, Professor of University of California. It was published in 1992 from University of California Press. It contains 436 pages. The author has selected those chapter of the Bihishti Zewar that best illustrate the themes of reformist thought about God, person, society and gender.

Content 
The author introduces the book by giving a preface. She then gives an introduction about her translation and then an introduction about Bihishti Zewar. The author has translated a total of five chapters of Bihishti Zewar. The chapters are: 1, 6, 7, 8, 10. By translating each chapter, the author has given an introduction along with it and then analyzed the interpretation of that chapter.

See also 
Islamic Revival in British India: Deoband, 1860-1900

References

External links 

1992 non-fiction books
American books
Deobandi fiqh literature
1992 books
English-language books
History of Islam
University of California Press books
Ashraf Ali Thanwi